Thomas Hickman Williams (January 20, 1801May 3, 1851) was a United States Senator from Mississippi. Born in Williamson County, Tennessee, he attended the common schools, moved to Mississippi and settled in Pontotoc County, and engaged in planting. He was appointed and subsequently elected as a Democrat to the U.S. Senate to fill the vacancy caused by the resignation of James F. Trotter and served from November 12, 1838, to March 3, 1839. After his time in the Senate he was secretary and treasurer of the University of Mississippi at Oxford from 1845 to 1851 and was known as "Father of the State University," being the first to propose it and also aiding to secure it.

Williams died on his plantation south of Pontotoc in 1851; interment was in the private cemetery on the family estate.

References

1801 births
1851 deaths
People from Williamson County, Tennessee
Democratic Party United States senators from Mississippi
Mississippi Democrats
19th-century American politicians